Robert Fortescue Fox  (1858–1940) was a British physician, surgeon, and one of the founders of physical medicine and rehabilitation.

Biography
R. Fortescue Fox qualified MRCS in 1882 at the London Hospital in 1882 and was house physician to Sir Andrew Clark. However, Fox developed tuberculosis, and went on a voyage to China as a ship's surgeon. Upon his return he went to Strathpeffer Spa in Ross-shire, where he recovered his health, practised medicine, and gained knowledge of balneology. In 1905 he returned to London and in 1913 published Principles and Practice of Medical Hydrology, adding to his reputation as an authority on British and foreign spas.

He was a strong advocate of treatment and training of the disabled war veterans, and became the first medical director of the Enham Village Centre, which opened in 1919. He continued as director for a year. Fox was instrumental in the creation of the British Red Cross Clinic for Rheumatism. He was one of the founders of the British Health Resorts Association. He was mainly responsible for the creation of the International Society of Medical Hydrology in 1921 and edited the Archives of Medical Hydrology for several years from 1922. He was elected FRCP in 1925.

R. Fortescue Fox's father was the seventh son of Quaker surgeon Joseph John Fox, who came from an unbroken line of Quaker doctors for five generations. All of the seven sons became doctors. The third son was Richard Hingston Fox, FRCP. Robert Fortescue Fox married Katherine Stewart MacDougall (1860–1937) and was the father of three daughters and three sons. The three daughters were Constance Mary (1886–1965), Hilda Angell (1887–1966), and Charlotte Iris (1890–1926). The three sons were William Fortescue (1892–1897), Andrew Stewart (1893–1915), and Theodore Fortescue (1899–1989). Andrew Stewart Fox was killed in action in WWI.

Selected publications

References

External links

1858 births
1940 deaths
19th-century British medical doctors
20th-century British medical doctors
Medical journal editors
Fellows of the Royal College of Physicians